McLure is a surname. Notable people with the surname include:

Carmel McLure, Australian jurist and barrister
Chester McLure (1875–1955), Canadian politician
James McLure (1951–2011), American playwright
James McLure (footballer) (born 1974), Australian rules footballer
Lindsay McLure (1913–2008), Australian rules footballer
Tom McLure, American football and baseball player

See also
McLure, British Columbia, a settlement in British Columbia, Canada
McClure (disambiguation)